Friedlanderia is a genus of moths of the family Crambidae.

Species
Friedlanderia cicatricella (Hübner, 1824)
Friedlanderia phaeochorda (Turner, 1911)

References

Haimbachiini
Crambidae genera